Kuttichira or Thekkepuram is a quarter located inside the city of Kozhikode in the Indian state of Kerala. Its approximate boundaries are the Arabian Sea on the West, the Kallai river on the South, Vellayil (a fishing village) on the North, and Kozhikode town on the East.

Location

References

External links 

Mappilas
Beaches of Kozhikode district
Kozhikode beach